Lynn Gray Gordon, D.D., (April 8, 1912 – June 14, 2003) was an American pastor, Christian educator, army chaplain, and college president.

Education
Lynn Gray Gordon was born on April 8, 1912 in Waxahachie, Ellis, Texas, USA.

He received his A.B. (Chem) from Texas Technological College in 1933, and M. Div. from Faith Theological Seminary in May 1949.

He served in the Texas State Department of Health as a Sanitary Engineer for 5 years, during which time the State sent him to study at Vandebilt University for one semester (1937), and at the Harvard University Graduate School of Public Health for one year (1938).

Chaplaincy 
Following the outbreak of World War II, he served in the Army as a Major, Sanitary Engineer, ending up in the Philippines in 1946.  He also served as a US Army Chaplain (Lt. Colonel) in Korea.

Ministry
Gordon served in the following capacity:
General Secretary, The Independent Board for Presbyterian Home Missions (IBPHM) 1962 – 1968
Vice President, Board of Directors, IBPHM : 1970-?
General Secretary, The Independent Board for Presbyterian Foreign Missions (IBPFM) 1969 – 1990
President, IBPFM: 1972 – 1995
President Emeritus of IBPFM : 1995 – 2003
President, The Associated Missions of the International Council of Christian Churches 1960-2003
Second Vice President and Member of Executive Committee of the International Council of Christian Churches

Publications
Gordon, Lynn Gray. World's Greatest Truths. Singapore: Far Eastern Bible College Press, 1999.

Death 
He died on June 14, 2003 in Melbourne, Brevard, Florida, United States. He is survived by his wife Maurine Ethlyn Ford, in Borger, Texas, whom he married on May 26, 1935.

References

1912 births
2003 deaths
United States Army chaplains
American Calvinist and Reformed theologians
Presidents of Calvinist and Reformed seminaries
Heads of universities and colleges in the United States
American Presbyterian ministers
Vanderbilt University alumni
Harvard School of Public Health alumni
Texas Tech University alumni
Faith Theological Seminary alumni
20th-century American clergy
People from Waxahachie, Texas
United States Army personnel of the Korean War